Hamiota is a former provincial electoral division in Manitoba, Canada. It was created by redistribution in 1903, and eliminated with the 1969 provincial election.

The constituency was located in the province's southwestern corner, and included the rural municipality of Hamiota.  Both the town and the electoral division were named after Thomas Hamilton, an early explorer.

Provincial representatives

References

Former provincial electoral districts of Manitoba